Kamel Larbi (born February 20, 1985 in Antibes) is an Algerian international football striker. He currently play with the french team AS Cagnes-Le Cros in the sixth division.

International career
On August 7, 2006, Larbi was called up for the first time to the Algerian National Team by head coach Jean-Michel Cavalli for a pair of friendlies against FC Istres and Gabon. He came on as a second half substitute against Istres but did not feature against Gabon. On November 15, 2010, Larbi got his first official cap in a friendly against Burkina Faso in Aix-en-Provence, France. He started and played the whole game at right-back as Algeria lost 2-1.

In the 2013-14 season, he played in Fréjus Saint-Raphaël in the Championnat National in France. In 2014-15 season he signed with MC Oran in Algeria.

References

External links
 
 DZFoot Profile
 

1985 births
Living people
People from Antibes
Algerian footballers
Algeria international footballers
OGC Nice players
FC Lorient players
Association football forwards
French sportspeople of Algerian descent
Ligue 1 players
US Sénart-Moissy players
Ligue 2 players
ES Uzès Pont du Gard players
ÉFC Fréjus Saint-Raphaël players
MC Oran players
Championnat National players
Expatriate footballers in Switzerland
Algerian expatriate sportspeople in Switzerland
CS Chênois players
FC Aurillac Arpajon Cantal Auvergne players
Sportspeople from Alpes-Maritimes
Footballers from Provence-Alpes-Côte d'Azur